Walter Ellsworth Brehm (May 25, 1892 – August 24, 1971) was a U.S. Representative from Ohio.

Biography
Born in Somerset, Ohio, Brehm attended the public schools and worked in steel mills, rubber factories, and oil fields after graduation from high school. He graduated from the Ohio State University College of Dentistry in Columbus in 1917 and attended Boston University, and Ohio Wesleyan University at Delaware, Ohio.

Brehm was a private in Company D, Seventh Regiment, Ohio Infantry from 1908 to 1913.

He engaged in the practice of dentistry in Logan, Ohio from 1921 to 1942.

Politics
He served as the Treasurer of the Republican Executive Committee of Hocking County, Logan City Council from 1936 to 1938 and served then in the State House of Representatives 1938–1942.

Brehm was elected as a Republican to the Seventy-eighth and to the four succeeding Congresses (January 3, 1943 – January 3, 1953).

Conviction
On December 20, 1950, Brehm was indicted by a federal grand jury in Washington, D.C. on charges that he accepted campaign contributions of $1000 from his clerk, Emma Craven, and from another clerk, Clara Soliday. On April 30, 1951, Brehm was convicted of taking the contribution from Craven, and acquitted of taking money from Soliday. On June 11, 1951, Federal Judge Burnita Shelton Matthews sentenced Brehm to five to fifteen months in prison, and fined him $5000. She suspended the sentence, saying that Brehm had led an exemplary life before the incident. He never served any time in prison.

Later years
He was not a candidate for reelection in 1952 to the Eighty-third Congress.
He resumed the practice of dentistry and affiliated with a dental supply company after retirement from active practice.
Resided in Columbus, Ohio, until his death there August 24, 1971.

See also
List of American federal politicians convicted of crimes
List of federal political scandals in the United States

Notes

References

1892 births
1971 deaths
20th-century American politicians
20th-century dentists
American dentists
Boston University alumni
Republican Party members of the Ohio House of Representatives
Republican Party members of the United States House of Representatives from Ohio
Military personnel from Ohio
Ohio politicians convicted of crimes
Ohio State University College of Dentistry alumni
Ohio Wesleyan University alumni
People from Logan, Ohio
People from Somerset, Ohio
Politicians from Columbus, Ohio
Ohio National Guard personnel